Madisyn Shipman (born November 20, 2002) is an American actress. She is known for playing Kenzie Bell in the Nickelodeon sitcom Game Shakers.

Early life
Shipman was born in Kings Mountain, North Carolina.  She is the eldest of four children, and her parents are Jen and Tracey Shipman.

Career
When Shipman was five, she began working with a talent agency that helped her land three different roles on Saturday Night Live, as well as roles on Sesame Street and on stage. She appeared in the play Enron on Broadway in 2010.

In 2015, she was cast in the lead role as Kenzie Bell, a girl who is one of the co-founders of the titular game company, in the Nickelodeon television series Game Shakers which is produced by Dan Schneider.

Personal life
Shipman has also been writing songs and playing guitar since she was eight.

Filmography

References

External links
 

2002 births
21st-century American actresses
Actresses from North Carolina
American child actresses
American web series actresses
Living people
People from Kings Mountain, North Carolina